Russian Proriv! (Cyrillic: Русский Прорыв, Russian for 'Russian Breakthrough') is a Russian-language newspaper from Tiraspol, the capital of Transnistria (also known as Pridnestrovie).

The paper was printed four times a month and consisted of seven folded D3-sized sheets. It had a circulation of 10,000 copies per week in 2007.

The first editor in chief was Roman Konoplev (Cyrillic: Роман Коноплев) (2007–2008).

References

External links 
 «Русский Прорыв» - новое слово в приднестровской журналистике AVA.MD 

Russian-language newspapers published in Moldova
Newspapers published in Moldova
Mass media in Transnistria
Mass media in Tiraspol
Weekly newspapers